VLGC may refer to:

Very Large Gas Carrier, a type of gas tanker used in shipping, see Gas carrier
VLGC, the Nasdaq code for Virologic, a bioscience company